The Glenamoy River (Irish:Abhainn Ghleann na Muaidhe) is a river in north County Mayo, in the northwest of Ireland. It is renowned for its stocks of sea trout and salmon.

Geography 
The Glenamoy River rises from its source at Glencalry and Barroosky. For the greater part of its length it flows westwardly, through Glenamoy, heading for the village of Gortacragher, where it meets the Muingnabo River at Sruwaddacon Bay. The catchment area of the Glenamoy River is 14 km2. The Glenamoy River has an elevation of 8 metres. It is particularly susceptible to fluvial flooding, in flood times, the river often becomes a roaring torrent sweeping away people and cattle. This river gets a good run of grilse and seatrout from July to September but because it is classed as a late river, fishing continues here up to early October. There are numerous fishing pools on the river, namely:

 Poll a Mhuileann (Mill Pool)
 Poll a Bhalla (Wall Pool), Wheelchair Pool
 Bun Na Muinge (Muing Pool)
 Poll na Bearaice (Barrack Pool)
 Poll Fada (Long Pool)
 Poll a' Droichead (Bridge Pool)
 Poll Padraig a Bhainc (Pat the Banks Pool)
 Spiorog 

The geology of this catchment is mainly schist, with the primary land use being peatland with pockets of forestry and agriculture. This catchment falls within two special areas of conservation (SAC's), the Slieve Fyagh Bog SAC to the south and Glenamoy Bog Complex SAC to the north and west. Nine sites were surveyed on the Glenamoy River Catchment between 26 and 27 July 2017 by Inland Fisheries Ireland.

Notable floods 

 August 1933 – After heavy rain the Muingnabo and Glenamoy rivers became swollen, cocks of hay and other debris washed downstream, three arches of the old bridge washed away due to the pressure from the rising waters. The Irish times reported:

'Sunday night was a night of terror for the people of Erris, County Mayo, where crops were destroyed and bridges swept away by the heavy rains. Several people were forced to flee from their homes near Glencastle. Rain fell in a deluge from mid-day until midnight in Erris, and crops along the swollen rivers were ruined, Glenamoy bridge was swept away, dislocating traffic between Belmullet and Ballycastle.' (The Irish Times, August 29th 1933).

Annie Brady's Bridge 
Near to the Glenamoy river lied the Annie Brady's Bridge. In 1841 a road running from Glenamoy to Carrowteige was approved and eventually completed in 1846, but no bridge was erected over the Muingnabo River. People could ford the river using an unsafe paving. During the Great Famine and following years, this river ford became the parting point between the emigrants and their families; scenes of lamentation and sadness were witnessed here.

Annie Brady was the wife of the Inspector of Fisheries for the area. She had a great love for the scenery of the district and saw those sad scenes. She decided to raised money to build a bridge at the site to help people to travel further with their loved ones and safer. The bridge was built in 1886 and swept away by a great flood in 1933. It was then replaced by a new structure still there today.

Amenities and fishing 
Under the 2011 Salmon Angling Regulations, the Glenamoy River is open for angling. A one fish per day bag limit applies from 1 May to 11 May, with a three fish per day limit applying between 12 May and 31 August. A one fish per day bag limit applies from 1 September to 30 September. The Glenamoy River is subject to a quota in 2011, with a brown gill tag also required for catches which are retained.

There is a fishing club, The Glenamoy Community Angling Association, which issues permits for angling on the river, which was set up in 1999. The river passes through the villages of Glencalry, Glenamoy, Spadow, and Gortacragher. Recently, there has been an addition of a wheelchair friendly pool in the fishery.

See also 

 Glenamoy
 Sruwaddacon Bay
 Corrib Gas Project
 List of rivers of County Mayo
 Kilcommon

References

External links 

 http://glenamoyangling.com/ news and information on angling in Glenamoy River

 https://issuu.com/inlandfisheriesireland/docs/mayo_guide_2015_english_final_issuu County Mayo Angling Guide
 https://www.logainm.ie/en/1165301 etymological information on The Glenamoy River
 https://www.mayo.ie/getmedia/168d8a2a-0277-40ce-bac8-4749acdb1644/3-6-Document6,24889,en.pdf Strategic Flood Risk Assessment to the Mayo County Development Plan 2014–2020
 http://wfdfish.ie/wp-content/uploads/2019/03/WRBD_Glenamoy_2017.pdf Inland Fisheries Island review of Glenamoy River Catchment

Rivers of County Mayo